Hoodies Squad (Polish: Blok Ekipa) is a Polish web animated series created by Bartosz Walaszek and broadcast on his YouTube channel SPInka Film Studio since June 10, 2013, having 250 episodes and 2 specials in total. Since the late 2015, the cartoon is also shown on Comedy Central Poland. Several episodes were also dubbed in Russian as Na Rayonye (На районе, Russian: 'On the hood'). 

Nearly all characters in the show, including the main protagonists, are voiced by Bartosz Walaszek himself. Several female voices are done by Katarzyna Kralewska-Walaszek.

Plot
The cartoon tells the story of a group of three lazy hooligans (Polish: dresiarze) from Warsaw – Spejson, Wojtas and Walo. All three are 20–30 years old, originate from poor, lower-class families, live in Warsaw's subdivision Grochów and are fans of Legia. They usually spend their time sitting on benches or in Speluno club, drinking beer and smoking. Because of their rowdy nature they are at odds with law and other hooligans.

The show sometimes makes references to or even features the real events and people such as the former President of Poland Aleksander Kwaśniewski or to YouTube personalities.

External links
 SPInka Film Studio channel on YouTube

Notes

References

Polish adult animated comedy television series
Polish web series